The Teshel Hydro Power Plant is an active hydro power project near Teshel, Bulgaria, part of the Dospat-Vacha Hydro Power Cascade. It has 2 individual Francis turbines which will deliver up to 60 MW of power.

External links

References

Hydroelectric power stations in Bulgaria
Buildings and structures in Smolyan Province